Beersel is a municipality located in the Belgian province of Flemish Brabant. The municipality comprises the towns of Alsemberg, Beersel proper, Dworp, Huizingen and Lot. On 1 January 2018 Beersel had a total population of 25,069. The total area is 30.01 km² which gives a population density of 835 inhabitants per km².  It is close to Brussels; Beersel is approximately 12 km southwest of the center of the city.

Beersel is perhaps best known for the "Kasteel van Beersel" (Beersel Castle), built between 1300 and 1310 by Jan II, the Duke of Brabant, as a defense for Brussels.  Guillaume Dufay (1397–1474), a notable 15th century Franco-Flemish composer, was likely born in Beersel.

Beersel is known for its boterham met plattekaas en radijzen (sandwich with white cheese and radishes), usually served with a geuze beer, and for its mandjeskaas (literally 'basket cheese'), which is a white cheese stored in little baskets. Beersel also has two traditional, authentic geuze breweries, Oud Beersel and 3 Fonteinen.

Famous people

Eugène Prévinaire (1805-1877, Huizingen), second governor of the National Bank of Belgium (NBB) from 1870 until 1877
Herman Teirlinck (1879-1967), writer
Stéphane Demol (1966), current assistant manager of the Belgium national football team
Morten Olsen (1949), former football player and manager of the Denmark national football team
Karel Van Miert (1942-2009), former European Commissioner
Guillaume Dufay (1397? – 1474), Burgundian composer

References

External links

Official website  - Only available in Dutch
 Gazetteer Entry

Municipalities of Flemish Brabant